Bigyn is an electoral ward, representing part of the community of Llanelli, Carmarthenshire, Wales. It is a three-member ward for the purposes of elections to Carmarthenshire County Council, with the number of councillors being increased from two to three for the elections held in May 2022.

Profile
In 2014, the Bigyn electoral ward had an electorate of 4,931. The total population was 6,750, of whom 83% were born in Wales. 23.0% of the population were able to speak Welsh.

Current Representation
The Bigyn Ward is a three-member ward for the purposes of Carmarthenshire County Council elections. Since 2022 it has been represented by Independent Michael Cranham and Labour Party councillors Janet Williams and Philip Warlow.

Carmarthen County Council elections
The first election to the new unitary Carmarthenshire County Council took place in 1995. Bigyn Ward had three seats, all of which were won by the Labour Party. Martin Morris, the sitting member for the ward on Dyfed County Council, was elected alongside Sandra Cooke and David Prothero, a former county councillor. Three sitting members of Llanelli Borough Council were unsuccessful.

 

At the 1999, the boundaries remained unchanged but the number of seats were reduced from three to two. Martin Morros contested the Tyisha Ward, where he was successful, allowing his two colleagues to be returned for Bigyn.

 
 

Labour again held both seats in 2004.

 
 

In 2008, Labour fared badly in the Llanelli area as a whole and lost both seats in Bigyn to Plaid Cymru.

 
 

 

 

In 2012, Labour, having held all seats in Bigyn from 1995 until 2008, regained both on a low turnout. Eryl Morgan was previously county councillor for Hengoed.

 
 
 

 
 
 

In May 2022, Independent Michael Cranham and Labour's Janet Williams came first and second. The third place vote was tied, on 596 votes, between the other two Labour candidates Philip Warlow and David Darkin. The winner was decided by the toss of a coin, with Warlow guessing correctly.

Earlier History

County Council Elections
The long-standing ward boundaries in Llanelli were redrawn in the 1980s to create five new wards, namely Bigyn, Elli, Glanymor, Lliedi and Tyisha. Each of these wards returned a member to Dyfed County Council in 1989 and 1993.

When the current Carmarthenshire County Council was formed in 1995, the Bigyn Wards remained unchanged and initially returned three members to the new authority. This was reduced to two members in 1999.

District Council Elections
From 1987, Bigyn formed an electoral ward for the purposes of elections to Llanelli Borough Council. Bigyn returned three members.

External links

References

Carmarthenshire electoral wards
Llanelli